Union Lake is an unincorporated community in Oakland County in the U.S. state of Michigan. It is located at the junction of four townships: Commerce, Waterford, West Bloomfield, and White Lake.

As an unincorporated community, Union Lake has no legally defined area or population statistics of its own, but it does have its own post office with the 48387 ZIP Code, which is used for P.O. Boxes only.  Otherwise, the area uses the 48327 Waterford ZIP Code.

References

External links

Lakes Area Chamber of Commerce
Union Lake Shores Association, Inc.

Unincorporated communities in Oakland County, Michigan
Unincorporated communities in Michigan
Metro Detroit